Minetto, New York is the name of a CDP and a town in  Oswego County, New York:

 Minetto (CDP), New York
 Minetto (town), New York